Kofi Amoako may refer to:

 Kofi Amoako Atta (born 1997), Ghanaian footballer
 Kofi Amoako (born 1979), Ghanaian footballer on the 1999 FIFA World Youth Championship squad
 Kofi Amoako, birth name for DJ Vyrusky, Ghanaian disc jockey